Helictotrichon pratense, known as meadow oat-grass, is a species of perennial flowering plant in the grass family Poaceae, found in temperate parts of Europe, North Africa, and Asia. Its culms are erect and 30–85 cm long; leaves are mostly basal. It is restricted to shallow, calcareous soils such as those formed on chalk and limestone substrates.

Synonyms 
 Arrhenatherum pratense (L.) Samp.
 Avena pratensis L.
 Avenochloa pratensis (L.) Holub
 Avenula pratensis (L.) Dumort.
 Avenula pratense
 Helictochloa pratensis Romero Zarco

References

See also 
 GrassBase entry
 
 Rzut. Oka Jeogr. Fiz. Wol. Pod. 10. 1828
 Roser, M. 1995. Taxon 44:395.
 Tutin, T. G. et al., eds. 1964–1980. Flora europaea. [Avenula pratensis (L.) Dumort.].
 Tzvelev, N. N. 1976. Zlaki SSSR.

pratense
Plants described in 1753
Taxa named by Carl Linnaeus